Fanny is a 1932 French romantic drama film directed by Marc Allégret and starring Orane Demazis, Raimu and Alida Rouffe. It is based on the 1931 play by Marcel Pagnol. It is the second part of the Marseillaise film trilogy that begins with Marius (1931) and concludes with César (1936). Like Marius, the film was a box office success in France and is still considered to be a classic of French cinema. It was shot at the Billancourt Studios in Paris and on location in Marseille. The film's sets were designed by the art director Gabriel Scognamillo.

Plot
The story takes place in Marseille. Marius, the son of barkeeper César, had a romance with Fanny, a neighbourhood girl and daughter of the fish salesman in the harbor. Marius then followed his dream by sailing away to travel the seven seas. Fanny then discovers she is pregnant by Marius, a shameful position in the community since she's a single mother with a father unable to secure the future of her and her child. She acquiesces to her mother's advice to marry a more prosperous salesman in the harbor, Honoré Panisse, who is 30 years older than she is. A few months after the marriage and the birth of the baby, Marius returns and tries to win back Fanny.

Cast
Orane Demazis as Fanny Cabanis
Raimu as César Olivier
Alida Rouffe as Honorine Cabanis
Charpin as Honoré Panisse
Robert Vattier as Albert Brun
 as Félix Escartefique
Milly Mathis as Claudine Foulon
Marcel Maupi as Mangiapan
Édouard Delmont as Félicien Venelle
Louis Boulle as Elzéar Bonnegrâce
 as Fortunette
Annie Toinon as Amélie
André Gide and Pierre Prévert have cameos

In popular culture
The famed restaurateur and founder of California cuisine, Alice Waters, was so taken by this film that she named her Berkeley restaurant "Chez Panisse". The café located above the restaurant is decorated with posters from the films Marius, Fanny and César.
The main characters from the films Marius, Fanny, and César make a cameo appearance in the 1965 Asterix comic book Asterix and the Banquet. The pétanque playing scene in the comic book is a reference to a similar scene in this film.

See also
The Black Whale, 1934 German version
Port of Seven Seas is James Whale's 1938 remake of Marius and Fanny.
Fanny, a 1961 remake of the 1932 version.
Fanny, a 2013 adaptation of the play, directed, written and starring Daniel Auteuil

References

External links

The Marseille Trilogy: Life Goes to the Movies an essay by Michael Atkinson at the Criterion Collection

1930s French-language films
1932 romantic drama films
Films based on works by Marcel Pagnol
Films directed by Marc Allégret
Films set in Marseille
Films shot in Marseille
Films shot at Billancourt Studios
French black-and-white films
French films based on plays
French romantic drama films
French sequel films
Seafaring films
1930s French films